Emilie Louise O'Konor (born 21 February 1983) is a Swedish retired ice hockey player. She won a silver medal with the Swedish national team in the women's ice hockey tournament at the 2006 Winter Olympics.

References

External links
 
 

1983 births
Living people
AIK Hockey Dam players
Djurgårdens IF Hockey Dam players
Ice hockey players at the 2006 Winter Olympics
Medalists at the 2006 Winter Olympics
Olympic ice hockey players of Sweden
Olympic medalists in ice hockey
Olympic silver medalists for Sweden
People from Danderyd Municipality
SDE Hockey players
Swedish women's ice hockey centres
Sportspeople from Stockholm County
21st-century Swedish women